Tharrawaddy is a city in Bago Region of lower Myanmar. It is the administrative seat of Tharrawaddy District and Tharrawaddy Township. It locates on the main Yangon-Pyay road and 76 miles away at the north of Yangon.

History
The current city was built when the region was under British rule, in the first British temporary seat at Thonze. However, Thonze is populated for district offices. Therefore, the city was moved two miles north of Thonze and the new district city was built in 1878. The name of the city called Tharrawaddy as the old Burmese name.

Climate

References

Populated places in Tharrawaddy District